The First Hollway Ministry was the 54th ministry of the Government of Victoria. It was led by the Premier of Victoria, Thomas Hollway, and consisted of members of the Liberal and Country parties. Hollway led a Liberal-Country coalition until the Country Party ministers resigned on 3 December 1948. He then led an interim Liberal ministry until 8 December, when he formed a full Liberal ministry. The ministry were sworn in on 20 November 1947, 3 December 1948, and 8 December 1948.

1st Hollway Ministry I (20 November 1947 to 3 December 1948) 

* Honorary positions

1st Hollway Ministry II (3 December 1948 to 8 December 1948) 

*Honorary positions

1st Hollway Ministry III (8 December 1948 to 27 June 1950) 

* Honorary positions

References 

Hollway
Ministries of George VI